Rudolf August Wilkens Straeuli (born 20 August 1963 in Pretoria, South Africa) is a former South African rugby union player and coach and currently the CEO of the Lions Rugby Company. He played in the positions of flanker and Number 8, making ten test appearances for South Africa in 1994 and 1995. He was the coach of the Springboks rugby team in 2002 and 2003. He also played for the  provincial team in the Currie Cup and Super 12 competitions.

Playing career
During 1993 he also toured with the South African Barbarians to the United Kingdom.

Straeuli made his debut for South Africa on 9 July 1994 against the All Blacks, in which he also scored a try. In all he played 10 tests, including representing South Africa in the 1995 Rugby World Cup, before his career ended on 18 November 1995 against England at Twickenham Stadium.

In 1997 he joined the Bedford Blues rugby club in England.

Test history 
 World Cup Final

Coaching career
In 1998 he transitioned from player to coach at Bedford.

Coastal Sharks
Staeuli coached the Coastal Sharks for the 2001 and 2002 seasons in the Super 12 tournament. In his first season in charge, he led the team to a runner up finish, having finished in last place the season before.

Springboks
In 2002, Straeuli took over as the head coach of the Springboks.

He coached the Springboks during the 2003 Rugby World Cup, a campaign that saw South Africa failing to reach the semi-finals of a World Cup for the first time. Straeuli was forced to resign shortly after the tournament when details of his infamous Kamp Staaldraad training camp came to light.

Overall Straeuli coached 23 tests and won only 52% of them, one of the worst records for a South African coach. He also won only two out of the 17 games played against the top six teams in the world.

Accolades
In 2006 he was inducted into the University of Pretoria Sport Hall of fame.

See also
List of South Africa national rugby union players – Springbok no. 616

References

External links

1963 births
Living people
South African rugby union coaches
Rugby union flankers
Rugby union number eights
South African rugby union players
South Africa international rugby union players
Golden Lions players
Bedford Blues players
South Africa national rugby union team coaches
University of Pretoria alumni
Rugby union players from Pretoria